Fatou Keïta (born 1965) is an Ivorian writer of children's books and novels.

Education and career
Born in Soubré in Ivory Coast, Fatou Keïta had her primary education in Bordeaux, where her father was studying surgery. She subsequently went to high school in Bouaké, where she gained her baccalaureate in 1974. In 1981, she graduated from the University of Côte d'Ivoire, and did further studies in England and the United States. In 1995 she won a Fulbright Scholarship and went to the University of Virginia at Charlottesville to research Black African women writers in the US as well as in England. She went on to become a lecturer in the English Department of the Université de Cocody.

She has won awards for her writings for children. Her first novel, Rebelle (1998), deals with female genital cutting.

Awards and honours
 1994, Le petit garçon bleu, First Prize, literary competition for Children's Books organised by the ACCT
 1997, Le petit garçon bleu, commendation, UNESCO Prize
 Le petit garçon bleu, Ivory Coast Prize for Excellence
 1995, Fulbright Scholarship
 Le Coq qui ne voulait plus chanter (NEI 1999), Prix Enfance, Association of Ivory Coast Writers
 2008, Le Loup du Petit Chaperon Rouge en Afrique (NEI/CEDA 2007), Mention Honorable, NOMA Prize

Bibliography
 1996: Le petit garçon en bleu, La voleuse de sourires, Sibani la petite dernière
 1998: Rebelle
 1999: Le coq qui ne voulait plus chanter
 2002: Le billet de 10 000 F
 2004: Un arbre pour Lollie
 2006: Et l'aube se leva…
 2009: Le chien qui aimait les chats!
 2011: La petite pièce de monnaie

References

External links
Fatou Keita Biography

1965 births
Living people
Ivorian women novelists
People from Bas-Sassandra District
Ivorian novelists
Ivorian children's writers
Ivorian women children's writers
20th-century novelists
20th-century women writers
21st-century novelists
21st-century women writers